Eduardo Fermé is an Argentinian computer scientist and philosopher known for his work in belief revision and non monotonic reasoning. He is Full Professor at the University of Madeira.

Career

Fermé studied Computer Science at the Universidad de Buenos Aires, graduating in 1991. After that, he obtained a doctoral degree in Computer Science from the Universidad de Buenos Aires under supervision of Carlos Alchourrón and Sven Ove Hansson in 1999. In 2011 he obtained a doctoral degree in philosophy from the Kungliga Tekniska högskolan under supervision of John Cantwell.
He has more than 70 publications in the area of belief revision, including the book Belief Change: Introduction and Overview with Sven Ove Hansson.

He was Professor at the Universidad de Buenos Aires from 1997 to 2002. From 2002 is Professor at the University of Madeira.
He is the coordinator of the Pole of NOVA LINCS at the University of Madeira. Fermé served as a member of the steering committee of the workshop series International Workshops on Nonmonotonic Reasoning (NMR) since 2018. He is an member of the editorial board of the Journal of Applied Logics, CAAI Transactions on Intelligence Technology and Journal Argument and Computation.

References

Argentine computer scientists
Living people
University of Buenos Aires alumni
Academic staff of the University of Madeira
1964 births